Gommecourt is the name of two communes in France:
 Gommecourt, Pas-de-Calais
 Gommecourt, Yvelines